Panda Island (Isla Panda) is a coral island located in the Archipelago of San Bernardo, Gulf of Morrosquillo, Caribbean Sea. It is governed by Colombia, and is a part of the Colombian Bolívar Department.

See also
 Caribbean region of Colombia
 Insular region of Colombia
 List of islands of South America

References

External links
 Wikimapia entry

Caribbean islands of Colombia